I Used to Think I Could Fly is the debut studio album by Canadian singer and songwriter Tate McRae, released on May 27, 2022, through RCA Records. It was preceded by the singles "Feel Like Shit", "She's All I Wanna Be", "Chaotic" and "What Would You Do?". McRae embarked on a tour in support of the album in June 2022. The album was met with positive reviews from music critics, and saw commercial success, entering the top 10 in various countries, while debuting at number thirteen on the US Billboard 200.

Background
McRae told NME in 2021 that she analysed the "structures" of albums like Frank Ocean's Blonde (2016), Billie Eilish's When We All Fall Asleep, Where Do We Go? (2019) and After Hours by the Weeknd (2020) as possible inspirations for the structure of her upcoming album. She explained to People in February 2022 that a number of her songs were "just [her] diary entries" and that when she has "ugly feelings" she writes them down.

McRae announced that she had finalized the track listing for the album and submitted it to her label on March 8, 2022, and she revealed the title and cover on April 1, 2022. After the album was originally set to have 12 tracks, McRae confirmed the inclusion of the track "What's Your Problem?" when the official track list was announced on April 11, 2022, bringing the total number of tracks up to 13.

Critical reception

I Used to Think I Could Fly received generally positive reviews from critics, praising the production, lyrical content, McRae's vocal performance and maturity in content. At Metacritic, which assigns a normalized rating out of 100 to reviews from mainstream critics, the album has an average score of 75 based on 9 reviews, indicating "generally favorable reviews".

Ims Taylor of DIY wrote that McRae "pulls out all the emotional stops" on the album, calling her "confiding her deepest feelings in us [...] comfortingly universal". Taylor further complimented McRae's "lush" vocals and concluded that her "arsenal of jagged pop weapons is extensive, and can be expertly wielded when she wants". John Amen wrote in The Line of Best Fit that "While McRae’s previous outings may have been more complexly assembled, her new songs are more immediately accessible." He went on to conclude, "The new album is, in essence, McRae’s first major step in forging a distinct pop presence." Writing for The Independent, Roisin O'Connor found there to be "angst aplenty" on the album, stating that McRae "trades in the R&B and pop punk sounds that were prevalent in the Noughties" while "emulating the hard-hitting lyrical truths of her Gen-Z peers, Billie Eilish and Olivia Rodrigo". O'Connor felt that McRae "sings like she's falling apart, but the quality of the album suggests she's got it together".

Brady Bickner-Wood from Pitchfork wrote that "even when she's singing about self-loathing, the 18-year old pop star and dancer exudes a swagger. Her full-length debut proves she's capable of transcending online virality".

Track listing

Notes
 On some versions of the album, "What's Your Problem?" is excluded from the tracklist.
 "Don't Come Back" interpolates "Ride wit Me" (2001) performed by Nelly.

Personnel
Musicians
 Tate McRae – lead vocals
 Alexander 23 – background vocals, drums, guitar (4, 9); synthesizer (4); bass, keyboards, percussion, programming (9)
 Greg Kurstin – bass, drums, keyboards, piano, synthesizer (5, 8); guitar (8)
 Sean Kennedy – guitar (9)
 David Cook – background vocals (13)

Technical

 Dave Kutch – mastering
 David Cook – mixing (1, 11), engineering (5, 8, 10, 11), engineering assistance (9, 12)
 Denis Kosiak – mixing (2)
 Jon Castelli – mixing (3, 4, 6)
 Mark Stent – mixing (5, 8)
 Clint Gibbs – mixing (6)
 Jeff Juliano – mixing (9, 11–13)
 Manny Marroquin – mixing (10)
 Henrique Andrade – engineering (2)
 James Keeley – engineering (2)
 Greg Kurstin – engineering (5, 8)
 Julian Burg – engineering (5, 8)
 Joey Raia – engineering (8)
 Daniel Cullen – engineering assistance (2)
 Ingmar Carlson – engineering assistance (3, 4, 6)
 Ryan Nasci – engineering assistance (3, 4, 6)
 Matt Wolach – engineering assistance (5, 8)
 Eric Kirkland – engineering assistance (9, 12)
 Chris Galland – engineering assistance (10)
 Jeremie Inhaber – engineering assistance (10)
 Robin Florent – engineering assistance (10)

Charts

References

2022 debut albums
Albums produced by Greg Kurstin
RCA Records albums
Tate McRae albums

Albums produced by Finneas O'Connell